José Villanueva may refer to:
José Villanueva (boxer) (1913–1983), Filipino boxer
José Antonio Villanueva (born 1979), Spanish track cyclist
José Luis Villanueva (born 1981), Chilean footballer
José Villanueva (footballer) (born 1985), Spanish footballer
José Luis Villanueva Orihuela (born 1964), Spanish racing cyclist

See also
San José Villanueva, municipality in El Salvador